This is a list of anime based on video games. It includes anime that are adaptations of video games or whose characters originated in video games. Many anime (Japanese animated productions usually featuring hand-drawn or computer animation) are based on Japanese video games, particularly visual novels and JRPGs. For example, the Pokémon TV series debuted in 1997 and is based on the Pokémon video games released in 1996 for the Game Boy.

List

See also
 List of films based on video games
 List of television series based on video games
 List of video games based on anime or manga

References

Anime
Lists of anime